Derbyshire is a county in East Midlands, England.

It may also refer to:
 Derbyshire (surname)
 Derbyshire (UK Parliament constituency), a defunct political division based on the county
 MV Derbyshire (built 1976), a Bridge-class OBO carrier that sunk in 9 September 1980 during Typhoon Orchid.
 Derbyshire Neck, a swelling in the neck
 Derbyshire CCC, an English 'county' first-class cricket club
 Derbyshire Redcap, an English breed of chicken from the county
 Derbyshire (European Parliament constituency)